Professor Humphrey Nwosu (born 2 October 1941) was chairman of the National Electoral Commission (NEC) appointed by President Ibrahim Babangida, holding office from 1989 to 1993.

Birth and early career

Nwosu was born on 2 October 1941, and became a professor of political science at the University of Nigeria, Nsukka. 
He served in the cabinet of Samson Omeruah, governor of the old Anambra State, where he helped traditional rulers to gain staffs of office and receive salaries, and settled intra and inter community land disputes. 
He also served as chairman of a Federal Technical Committee on the application of Civil Service Reforms in the local government service.
He was appointed NEC chairman in 1989 after his predecessor (and former mentor) Eme Awa resigned due to a disagreement with Ibrahim Babangida.

12 June 1993 elections
Nwosu conducted the 12 June 1993 election, which was seen as the freest and fairest election to date, in which Chief Moshood Abiola was presumed to have won. Nwosu's commission introduced the novel Option A4 voting system and the Open ballot system.
Nwosu had released many of the election results when he was ordered to stop further announcement by the military regime.
In 2008 he published a book in which he claimed that Babangida was not to blame for annulling the election. 
The book was severely criticized for failing to accurately account for what happened.

Bibliography

References

Living people
1941 births
Academic staff of the University of Nigeria